Lekanger is a village in the municipality of Gildeskål in Nordland county, Norway.  The village is located on the western side of the island of Sandhornøya, south of the villages of Mårnes and Våg.  Nordstranda Chapel is located in the village.

References

Gildeskål
Villages in Nordland